"Feelings Gone" is a song by British electronic music duo Basement Jaxx. It was released on 8 September 2009 as the second single from their fifth studio album, Scars. It was digitally released on 8 September in the United States and was released in the United Kingdom on 21 September 2009. The song features vocals from the Australian-born singer-songwriter Sam Sparro.

Music video 

The music video for the song was directed by Andy Soup and released on 28 August 2009. It has a futuristic theme.

Critical reception 

Digital Spy gave the song three stars, describing it as "a slice of fairly unremarkable dance-pop" and commented on Sam Sparro's vocals as "quirky enough to keep things interesting as he soars, squeaks and squalls his way through this track."

Release history

References

External links 

 Official music video on YouTube

Basement Jaxx songs
XL Recordings singles
2009 singles
Sam Sparro songs
2009 songs
Songs written by Felix Buxton
Songs written by Simon Ratcliffe (musician)